Kyrychenko is a gender-neutral Ukrainian surname.

People

Kyrychenko
 Daryna Kyrychenko (born 1998), Ukrainian snowboarder
 Ruslana Kyrychenko (born 1975), Ukrainian basketball player
 Svitlana Kyrychenko (1935–2016), Ukrainian human rights activist

See also
 
 Kirichenko

Ukrainian-language surnames